Paulus Church (Norwegian: Paulus kirke; tr. Paul's Church or St. Paul's Church) is a church which was consecrated in 1892, located in Grünerløkka in Oslo, Norway, just opposite the Birkelunden Park.  The church is made of brick with a weak front running cross-arms and has about 500 seats. It is inspired by German Gothic style and has a high narrow tower above the entrance, which faces east. Paul's Church was designed by the architect Henrik Bull in 1889, and restoration of the church were made in 1917-18 and in 1972.

The Church's altarpiece is in the brown-stained pine with gold trim and divided into three. It is adorned with trumpet angels  by Jo Visdalen and two altar paintings by Christen Brun. Between the two paintings are a Christ Figure in plaster made by the sculptor Gunnar Olsen Alvær in 1894.

The church organ at Paulus Church was designed by the German organ maker Albert Hollenbach to the church's consecration in 1892. The organ underwent an expansion in 1943.

Gallery

References

External links 
Official parish website (in Norwegian)
Official website about Paulus Church (building) (in Norwegian)

Lutheran churches in Oslo
Grünerløkka
Churches completed in 1892
1892 establishments in Norway
19th-century Church of Norway church buildings